Patrick "Rudeboy" Tilon (born 1964, Suriname) (also Rudeboy Remington, Silver Surfering Rudeboy, Microphone Nazi, Sir Antagonist) is a Dutch musician, best known as the singer of the crossover band Urban Dance Squad, which he led from 1986 to 2000, and the first two albums of Dutch electronic musician Junkie XL (1997-2000). <p>After Urban Dance Squad disbanded in 2000, he left Junkie XL and made a few records with short-lived bands and projects: The League Of XO Gentlemen (Smiling At The Claptrap Circuses, 2003) and Club Of High Eyebrows (Older Now, 2007). Tilon also worked in the catering industry during this period. Since 2011 he is singing under a new moniker, The Arguido, with the Amsterdam surf band The Phantom Four, which released the album Sounds From the Obscure in 2012.<p>
In 2019 Tilon joined noise rock band The Cold Vein from Nijmegen. In 2022 they published their first album Simple Trick More Voodoo. 
Late 2021 he started performing again with former Urban Dance Squad-dj DJ DNA (Arjen de Vreede) under the title Rudeboy plays UDS featuring DJ DNA ,, playing UDS-songs with a new band: Axel van Oort (bass), Matthias van Beek (guitar) and Jochem van Rooijen (drums).

References

1964 births
Living people
Dutch male singers
Dutch rappers
Surinamese emigrants to the Netherlands
Musicians from Amsterdam